Picea morrisonicola, the Taiwan spruce, is a species of conifer in the family Pinaceae. It is found only in Taiwan, and it is the only species of spruce in Taiwan. It is the southernmost species of spruce in the world, being spread near the Tropic of Cancer, and, subsequently, is only thought to be hardy to USDA Zone 8.

Taiwan spruce is one of the most important timber species in Taiwan. Populations have declined because of overexploitation.

References

morrisonicola
Endemic flora of Taiwan
Trees of Taiwan
Vulnerable flora of Asia
Taxonomy articles created by Polbot